The Ruins is a 2006 horror novel by American author Scott Smith, set on Mexico's Yucatan Peninsula. The book fits specifically into the survival horror genre, which is marked by people doing whatever it takes to conquer their environment and stay alive. The novel was released on July 18, 2006.

A film adaptation of the novel was released in the United States and Canada on April 4, 2008.

Plot summary 
Four American tourists — Eric, his girlfriend Stacy, her best friend and former roommate Amy, and Amy's boyfriend Jeff, a medical student — are vacationing in Mexico. They befriend a German tourist named Mathias, and a trio of Greeks who go by the Spanish nicknames Pablo, Juan, and Don Quixote. Jeff volunteers the group to accompany Mathias as he attempts to find his brother Heinrich, who went missing after having followed a girl he'd met to an archeological dig. As they leave the hotel, Pablo joins them, leaving a note and a map for Juan and Don Quixote.

The six of them head down to the rural Yucatan in search of Heinrich. The driver of the pickup truck who takes them to the outskirts of Coba tells Amy that the place to which they are going is "not good," and offers to drive the group somewhere else. Amy does not quite get the message and leaves anyway. Near a Mayan village, they discover a disguised trail which leads to a large hill covered in vines and surrounded by bare earth. The group approach the hill, and are confronted by armed men from the village. Jeff attempts to communicate with them in Spanish, but they do not respond. After Amy steps on the vine-covered hill when attempting to take a picture of the entire group, the men force the group to stay on the vine-covered hill.

At the top of the hill is an abandoned campsite with tents, and a makeshift windlass and rope leading down a mine shaft. Much of the camp is overgrown with the same vines that cover the hill. Believing they may be able to escape down the far side of the hill, Jeff and Mathias go down the other side to find more Mayans arriving and forming a perimeter around the hill, with bows and rifles ready to shoot them if they attempt to leave. They also discover Heinrich's body, killed by the Mayans and overgrown with vines. As they return to the camp, they realize the vines secrete an acidic sap, which burned their hands as they pulled the vines from Heinrich's body.

Hearing the ring of a cell phone from the bottom of the shaft, they use the rope to lower Pablo down in an attempt to retrieve it. However, the acid from the vines has weakened the rope, which snaps, sending Pablo falling down the shaft. They lower Eric after him, and he jumps to the bottom when they realize the rope isn't long enough, injuring his leg in the process. As the group fashions makeshift rope from one of the tents, Eric discovers that Pablo's back is broken, paralyzing him from the waist down. The group fashions a makeshift spinal board, lowering it and Amy down into the mine shaft. Eric and Amy manage to get Pablo onto the board before the lamp goes out. The cell phone rings again, and Eric tries to find it, determining that the sound is coming from another shaft in the mine.

While the group remains optimistic that Juan and Don Quixote will arrive, following Pablo's note, Jeff makes preparations to ration food and water. He also decides, before they go to sleep, that they should remain awake in shifts to watch over Pablo. As night falls, Jeff ventures back down the hill to find the Mayans are still there, but notices a gap that he may be able to slip through. As he moves closer to the base of the hill, he hears a flock of birds nearby which alert the Mayans to his position.

The next morning, the group awaken to find that the vine has wrapped around Eric's injured leg and pushed itself into his wound, and that they have wrapped themselves around Pablo's legs. As they pull the vines off of Pablo, they discover that the vines have eaten his lower legs down to the bone. This causes Amy to vomit, and she and Stacy watch in terror as a vine emerges from the hill to drink the puddle of vomit. Jeff decides to put up signs around the base of the hill, warning the remaining Greeks to stay away and get help if they should arrive. As he makes his way around the hill, he finds the corpses of others who have died there. He also realizes that the vines only consume organic material, as the victims' passports, jewelry, and the Mayans' arrowheads and bullets are intact. Further, he finds that the Mayans are apparently afraid of the vines, having salted the earth around the hill to keep them at bay, and will kill them if they attempt to leave the hill to prevent the vines from spreading through the spores in the group's clothing.

Returning to where he placed his first sign, he finds that it has been removed. Initially suspecting the Mayans, he discovers that the vines took it down, along with another warning sign left by a previous victim of the hill. Jeff returns to camp to share this new information with the others. He also decides that they should have someone wait at the bottom of the hill in case Juan and Don Quixote arrive. Meanwhile, Pablo's condition has severely worsened with the flesh being eaten away from his legs, and Jeff fears he will soon die of infection. While Amy keeps watch for the Greeks, the rest of the group vote - reluctantly - to amputate Pablo's legs.

With their resources dwindling, Jeff decides to return to the mine shaft to find the cell phone, taking Amy with him. In the mine, he fashions a torch and they search for the phone, following the sound down the other shaft in the mine. Jeff realizes that there is no phone: the vines can imitate sounds they hear, and have been attempting to lure him and Amy into falling down another shaft to their deaths. As Amy is lifted out of the mine, the group hears the vines laughing. Meanwhile, Eric grows increasingly disturbed, believing that the vine is growing inside of him, though the others do not believe him.

Later on, Eric, Amy, and Stacy get drunk on the tequila that Pablo brought along, eventually getting into a heated argument. They realize in horror that the vines can imitate voices, as well, repeating their criticisms of each other, Jeff, and Mathias. Pablo wakes up and asks for water, which Amy gives him, along with a grape from the group's rations. Jeff returns, infuriated that they drank alcohol with so little water between them, and that Eric has once again cut himself attempting to remove the vine from inside his body. After Jeff and Amy get into a heated argument, she leaves him alone as he watches over Pablo. Jeff hears her calling out to him and vomiting, but believes she is drunk and ignores her.

The next morning they discover that Amy is dead, the vines having grown down her throat and forcing her to drown in her own vomit. The vines have again wrapped around Eric's leg, inserting themselves into the initial cuts on his leg, and the cut he made on his abdomen the day before. They place Amy's body in a sleeping bag, and Jeff suggests that they consider preserving her body in order to cannibalize her if the Greeks do not arrive before their food runs out. Stacy is appalled and talks him out of it, and they all agree to bury Amy. Later, they hear Amy calling for Jeff. When they open the sleeping bag, they realize the vines had been imitating her voice, and have already eaten her down to the bone. That night, while Jeff is on lookout for the Greeks, it begins to rain heavily, forcing the Mayans to take cover in the trees. He sees this as an opportunity to escape and get help, but is shot dead by the Mayans. As he dies, he feels the vines pull his body back toward the hill.

During the storm, Stacy takes advantage of the rain to bathe herself while Mathias watches over Pablo and Eric rests in the tent. Later, the vines imitate the sounds of Stacy and Mathias having sex, which infuriates Eric, as Stacy has had numerous affairs in the past. Stacy insists that the vines are lying, and Mathias declines to respond. Mathias discovers that, during their argument, the vines have smothered Pablo to death, and left Jeff's hat on his skull. The vines taunt Mathias in Heinrich's voice - speaking in German - that Heinrich and Jeff are both dead.

In the morning, Eric's fears about the vines growing inside him appear to be justified, as Mathias removes vines from his chest and leg. While Stacy and Mathias go to look for Jeff, Eric is alone with the knife, and begins his attempts to excise the vines on his own. The vines later taunt Stacy and Mathias that Eric is dead. They return to camp to find him alive, but heavily injured, having cut off his own ear and flayed much of his skin in an effort to remove the vine. Mathias attempts to take the knife from Eric, but is accidentally stabbed through the heart. The vines pull his body into them. Stacy realizes they have not done the same to Eric in order to torment her by watching him die. Eric begs her to kill him, as he is too weak to do so himself, and, after pleading with each other, she stabs him in the heart.

Stacy, now alone, goes to the bottom of the path up the hill to wait for Juan and Don Quixote. The Mayans have determined that she is the last one left, and have begun breaking down their camps. When the Greeks do not arrive by nightfall, she calmly slits her wrists, hoping that her body will be a warning to them when they arrive. As she bleeds out, the vines pull her back into the underbrush.

Three days later, the other two Greeks, with some Brazilian tourists in tow, find the trail. A little girl, who is acting as a sentinel, as the little boy on the bike was, runs back to the village, but the new tourists are already halfway up the hill, calling for Pablo, before the Mayans arrive.

Publication history 
 
According to an interview with the Pittsburgh Tribune-Review, the book started as a trial run after a period when the novelist had concentrated on writing the screenplay for A Simple Plan. "It went in stops and starts," Smith told journalist Regis Behe. "I would give up on it, thinking it wouldn't work...With The Ruins I really just started writing. I had a general sense of the story. I knew how I wanted it to end, but all the steps to get there... I just wrote it. I didn't plan it, and, obviously, that had major repercussions that carried through the story." Smith added that he never traveled to Mexico, where the book is set; he merely read a few travel books and did some Internet research.

Critical reception
Entertainment Weekly reviewer Gillian Flynn gave The Ruins an A−, calling it "Thomas Harris meets Poe in a decidedly timely story," continuing, "Smith has tapped into our anxieties about global warming, lethal weather, supergerms—our collective fear that nature is finally fighting back—and given us a decidedly organic nightmare."

Michiko Kakutani, writing for The New York Times, said, "As in his debut novel, A Simple Plan (Knopf, 1993), Mr. Smith is concerned with what happens to a group of ordinary people when they are suddenly placed in a decidedly extraordinary situation. In that earlier book, evil turns out to be something that lurks deep within his heroes' greedy hearts. In The Ruins, evil is something randomly stumbled upon in the jungle." Kakutani was unimpressed, comparing the novel unfavorably with Little Shop of Horrors and saying, "The Ruins, however, isn't a comedy or a musical. It seems meant to be a straight-ahead thriller, with some bloody set pieces lifted from the horror genre thrown in for extra chills: you know, grisly, up-close shots of people having their legs chewed up or being choked to death by demonic forces. Whatever humor is produced by the story's Cruel Talking Plants appears to be entirely inadvertent."

In Salon, Laura Miller warned, "Don't start this book if you're especially weak of stomach or nerves, and above all don't pick it up if you're not willing to tolerate some deviation from the usual conventions of thrillers and horror stories. Not everything will be explained to you, and not everything will turn out in the tidy, reassuring ways to which we've all become accustomed. The Ruins is like all great genre fiction in its irresistible storytelling momentum, but in its lack of mercy, it's more like real life."

Reviewer Tony Buchsbaum found himself "blown away by the author's crisp, clearly-focused way with a scene. He paints each one like a great artist, yet also holds back, sharing only the bits and pieces of detail that you need to make the scene your own." He adds,

Stephen King made the comment in a column for Entertainment Weekly, writing, "The Book of the Summer: That would be The Ruins, by Scott Smith, last heard from in 1993 (A Simple Plan, later filmed by Sam Raimi from Smith's script). No quietly building, Ruth Rendell-style suspense here; Smith intends to scare the bejabbers out of you, and succeeds. There are no chapters and no cutaways—The Ruins is your basic long scream of horror. It does for Mexican vacations what Jaws did for New England beaches in 1975."

The Pittsburgh Tribune-Review said that the novel "is, superficially, the perfect summertime beach read. Between the lines of The Ruins, however, is a dark, sometimes scathing, social commentary." The reviewer added that it "has a strange duality in that it directly pays homage to Rod Serling's Twilight Zone, and indirectly to The Corrections by Jonathan Franzen. The story of four young Americans caught in a deadly situation on a trip to Mayan ruins in Mexico, it builds a tension that Serling excelled at, created from knowing that a situation is spinning out of control in ways beyond the characters' comprehension."

References

2006 American novels
American novels adapted into films
American horror novels
Novels set in Mexico
Works by Scott Smith